The 10th Academy Awards were held on March 10, 1938 to honor films released in 1937, at the Biltmore Hotel in Los Angeles, California and hosted by Bob Burns. Originally scheduled for March 3, 1938, the ceremony was postponed due to the Los Angeles flood of 1938.

This was the last year for two Oscars categories: Best Dance Direction, which this year saw the only nomination ever received by a Marx Brothers film (Dave Gould for "All God's Children Got Rhythm" in A Day at the Races), and Best Assistant Director.
 
The Life of Emile Zola was the first film to receive ten nominations and the second consecutive biographical film to win Best Picture, following the previous year's The Great Ziegfeld. Luise Rainer received the Academy Award for Best Actress for The Good Earth, earning her the distinctions of being the first actor to win two Academy Awards and the first to win consecutive acting awards, following her win for The Great Ziegfeld.

A Star Is Born was the first color film to receive a Best Picture nomination.

Walt Disney's Snow White and the Seven Dwarfs, the world's first full-length Technicolor animated feature film with sound and widely seen as one of the greatest motion pictures of all time, received only one nomination, for Best Original Score. The following year, the Academy presented Disney an Honorary Academy Award (consisting of one full-size Oscar statuette and seven miniature statuettes on a stepped base) "for creating Snow White and the Seven Dwarfs [1937], recognized as a significant screen innovation which has charmed millions and pioneered a great new entertainment field for the motion picture cartoon". This is a rare case of a film being recognized in two successive ceremonies.

This was the first year in which every film nominated for Best Picture received multiple nominations.

Winners and nominees 

Nominations announced on February 6, 1938. Winners are listed first and highlighted in boldface.

Multiple nominations and awards 

The following twenty films received multiple nominations:

 10 nominations: The Life of Emile Zola
 7 nominations: Lost Horizon and A Star Is Born
 6 nominations: The Awful Truth and In Old Chicago
 5 nominations: The Good Earth and One Hundred Men and a Girl
 4 nominations: Captain Courageous, Dead End and Stage Door
 3 nominations: The Hurricane and Souls at Sea
 2 nominations: Conquest, A Damsel in Distress,  Maytime, Night Must Fall, The Prisoner of Zenda, Stella Dallas, Waikiki Wedding, Topper and Walter Wanger's Vogues of 1938

The following four films received multiple awards:

 3 awards: The Life of Emile Zola
 2 awards: The Good Earth, In Old Chicago and Lost Horizon

Academy Honorary Awards 

 Mack Sennett "for his lasting contribution to the comedy technique of the screen, the basic principles of which are as important today as when they were first put into practice, the Academy presents a Special Award to that master of fun, discoverer of stars, sympathetic, kindly, understanding comedy genius – Mack Sennett".
 Edgar Bergen "for his outstanding comedy creation, 'Charlie McCarthy.
 Museum of Modern Art Film Library "for its significant work in collecting films dating from 1895 to the present and for the first time making available to the public the means of studying the historical and aesthetic development of the motion picture as one of the major arts".
 W. Howard Greene "for the color photography of A Star Is Born".

Irving G. Thalberg Memorial Award 

 Darryl F. Zanuck

See also 

 1937 in film

References 

Academy Awards ceremonies
1937 film awards
1938 in Los Angeles
1938 in American cinema
March 1938 events